Beyören can refer to:

 Beyören, Akçakoca
 Beyören, Emirdağ